Stigmella aladina is a moth of the family Nepticulidae. It is found in Russia (Primorskiy Kray), China (Heilongjiang) and Japan (Honshu, Kyushu).

The wingspan is 4.6-5.7 mm. There are two generations per year. Adults are on wing in July and August and again in spring, although this second generation is only known from reared specimens.

The larvae feed on Quercus mongolica and Quercus serrata and Quercus acutissima in Japan. They mine the leaves of their host plant. The mine consists of a long narrow linear gallery with linear black frass throughout, very similar to Stigmella dentatae and Stigmella roborella.

External links
Japanese Moths
Nepticulidae (Lepidoptera) in China, 1. Introduction and Stigmella (Schrank) feeding on Fagaceae

Nepticulidae
Moths of Asia
Moths described in 1984